Meredith Cody Jinks (born August 18, 1980) is an American outlaw country music singer and songwriter. His breakout 2016 album, I'm Not the Devil, reached No. 4 on the Billboard Country Albums chart, while a number of other albums such as Lifers, After the Fire, and The Wanting reached No. 2 on the same chart.

Early life
Cody Jinks is a native of Haltom City, near Fort Worth, Texas, United States, and attended Haltom High School. He started learning to play a few country music riffs on the guitar from his father when he was 16, but soon formed a heavy metal band.

Music career
Jinks started out as the lead singer of a thrash metal band from Fort Worth named Unchecked Aggression, initially named Silas, that was active from 1998 to 2003. He also played the lead guitar; the other band members were Gary Burkham on bass who left in 2000 and was replaced by Chris Lewis, Anthony Walker on drums, and Ben Heffley on guitar. They were influenced by Metallica and Pantera. An album, The Massacre Begins was released in 2002. Songs they recorded included "Hell Razor" and "Kill Me Again". The band however broke up after a trip to Los Angeles, and Jinks took a year off from music. In around 2005, he started playing country music, the music he grew up with.

Jinks is backed by The Tone Deaf Hippies. He began to release albums in the country genre in 2008. An album titled 30 was released in 2012. He began to develop his own sound in an EP, Blacksheep, which was released in 2013.

2015: Adobe Sessions
The album was recorded at the Sonic Ranch in Tornillo, Texas, and the album title was named after a small adobe room they recorded the album in. It was released in January 2015 and charted in Billboard's regional Heatseekers charts – No.2 on Heatseekers South Central and No. 8 on Heatseekers Mountain. Jinks toured in support of Adobe Sessions as an opener for Sturgill Simpson in 2015.

2016: I'm Not the Devil
I'm Not the Devil was released on August 12, 2016.  The album was recorded at the Sonic Ranch in Tornillo, Texas. It includes a cover of Merle Haggard's "The Way I Am".  The title track was written with Ward Davis; the album was almost finished and the album title had already been decided, but it was retitled with the name of the song they wrote. The album debuted at No. 4 on the Top Country Albums chart, selling 11,300 copies in the first week. Jinks supported I'm Not the Devil with a co-headlining tour with Whitey Morgan and the 78's in August, September, and October. The album was rated one of the best country albums of 2016 by Rolling Stone.

2017
Jinks released a cover of Pink Floyd's hit song "Wish You Were Here" in January 2017. He also re-released a remixed and remastered version of his 2010 album Less Wise, as Less Wise Modified 2017, with three bonus tracks included.

2018: Lifers
Jinks released the album Lifers on July 27, 2018, via Rounder Records. It was preceded by the lead single "Must Be the Whiskey", which was released on June 15, 2018.

2019: After the Fire and The Wanting
On October 11, 2019, Jinks released the album After the Fire. The album was independently produced and released by his own label, Late August Records, marking a departure from Rounder Records, with whom he produced 2018's Lifers. The album was preceded by two singles, "Ain't a Train" and "Think Like You Think". Jinks also promoted the song "William and Wanda", which was written about his late grandparents. For the week of October 26, 2019, the album was No. 2 on the Billboard Top Country Albums chart.

One week later, October 18, 2019, Jinks released a second album, The Wanting. Similar to After the Fire, the album was independently produced. It was preceded by two singles, "Same Kind of Crazy as Me" and "Which One I Feed".

On October 24, 2019, both albums held the No. 1 and 2 spots for Top Albums on iTunes and Apple Music.

Discography

Studio albums

Live albums

Extended plays

Singles

References

American country singer-songwriters
American male singer-songwriters
Living people
Country musicians from Texas
Singer-songwriters from Texas
1980 births
Outlaw country singers
People from Denton, Texas
People from Tarrant County, Texas
21st-century American singers
21st-century American male singers
Rounder Records artists